Bicycle parking is part of the cycling infrastructure of a populated place allowing for the storage of bicycles when they are not being used. Parking facilities for bicycles include racks, lockers, parking stations, and covered areas. Bicycle parking infrastructure, in addition to cyclists' equipment such bicycle locks, offers a degree of security and may prevent bicycle theft. Ad hoc bicycle parking alongside railings, signs, and other street furniture is a common practice and may be recognized through formal legal arrangements.

Bicycle parking is an important consideration for the cyclability of a locality. Secure bicycle parking is a factor that influences people's decision to cycle. Bicycle parking at mass transit stations facilitates mixed-mode commuting. The role of bicycle parking in urban planning is studied through the discipline of bicycle transportation planning and engineering. Provisions for bicycle parking may be included in municipal policies and regulations.

Overview 

Bicycle parking is an important part of a municipality's cycling infrastructure and as such is studied in the discipline of bicycle transportation engineering. When bicycle parking facilities are scarce or inadequate, nearby trees or parking meters are often used instead.

Sections of existing car parks can often be retrofitted as cycle parking, offering advantages of location, cover, security, and parking for more people.

In addition to car parking, town planning policies and regulations increasingly require provisions for bicycle parking in new developments. Many mass transit stations include bicycle parking in the form of bike racks or purpose-built bicycle parking stations to facilitate mixed-mode commuting.

Secure bicycle parking is arguably a key factor that influences the decision to cycle. To be considered secure, parking facilities must be of a suitable design; allowing the bicycle to be locked via the frame (see bicycle parking rack). A readily observable location can also permit so-called passive security from passers-by. Weather protection is also desirable. As a rule, where cycling is encouraged as an alternative to motoring, efforts should be made to make bicycle parking more convenient and attractive to use than nearby car parking arrangements. This usually means providing a wide distribution of visible, clearly designated parking spots, close to the entrances of destinations being served.

Storage rooms or bicycle lockers may also be provided. In some cases, large concentrations of bike parking may be more appropriate, sometimes being supervised and sometimes fee-based. Examples include bicycle parking stations at public transport interchanges such as railway, subway, tram, bus stations or ferry ports where they may be useful in mixed-mode commuting.

Conversely, where cycling is seen as an unwelcome or inappropriate activity, or there is a lack of knowledge about best practices, bicycle parking may simply not be provided or else placed at awkward, distant, and out-of-sight locations. Cyclists may be expressly forbidden from parking their bicycles at the most convenient locations. In April 2007, the authorities at the University of California's Santa Barbara campus started confiscating bicycles parked at other than official bike racks. Some property owners or municipal authorities display signage on fencing to discourage bicyclists from locking their bicycles.

Types and equipment 
Bicycle parking rack - also known as bicycle stand
Bicycle parking station
Bicycle lock
Bicycle locker
Cyclability
Sucker pole (not recommended for bicycle parking due to high incidents of theft)

Gallery 
Urban planning

Bike racks

See also

 Outline of cycling

References

External links

Victoria Transportation Policy Institute TDM Encyclopedia - Bike parking
Bicycles at Rest Non-commercial bike parking resource.

 
Cycling infrastructure